Malik Ek is a Hindi spiritual film on Sai Baba of Shirdi featuring Jackie Shroff, Manoj Kumar and Divya Dutta. Shroff plays in the title role. The film is directed by Deepak Balraj Vij and the music is scored by Anup Jalota, who also plays the role of Das Ganu. The film was released on 29 October 2010.

Cast 
 Jackie Shroff as Sai Baba of Shirdi
 Kishori Shahane as Shakuntala
 Manoj Kumar
 Divya Dutta
 Rohini Hattangadi
 Smriti Irani

Soundtrack
The music was composed by Anup Jalota and released by T-Series.

References

External links
 
 "Malik Ek" listing at My-India.net
 RadioSargam.com: On-set stills from 6 January 2008
 ZoomTv.in: Video clip (hindi) where Jackie Schroff reflects on how the film has changed his life.
 BollywoodSargam: Video clip (hindi) with Jackie Shroff speaking about Malek Ek

2010s Hindi-language films
Indian biographical films
Sai Baba of Shirdi
Films directed by Deepak Balraj Vij
Indian historical films
2010s biographical films
2010s historical films
2000s Hindi-language films